Anton Urban (16 January 1934 – 5 March 2021) was a Slovak footballer who played as a defender for Slovan Bratislava. He was the captain of the Czechoslovakian silver medal winning team at the 1964 Summer Olympics in Tokyo. He won the Czechoslovak Cup on three occasions.

References

External links 
 
 
 
 
 

1934 births
2021 deaths
People from Košice-okolie District
Sportspeople from the Košice Region
Czechoslovak footballers
Association football defenders
Slovak footballers
Olympic footballers of Czechoslovakia
Olympic silver medalists for Czechoslovakia
Olympic medalists in football
Footballers at the 1964 Summer Olympics
Medalists at the 1964 Summer Olympics
ŠK Slovan Bratislava players
FC Wacker Innsbruck players
ŠK Slovan Bratislava managers
FC Petržalka managers
Slovak football managers
Czechoslovak expatriate footballers
Czechoslovak expatriate sportspeople in Austria
Expatriate footballers in Austria